The 2017–18 Toledo Rockets men's basketball team represented the University of Toledo during the 2017–18 NCAA Division I men's basketball season. The Rockets, led by eighth-year head coach Tod Kowalczyk, played their home games at Savage Arena, as members of the West Division of the Mid-American Conference. With win over Northern Illinois on February 27, 2018, the Rockets clinched the MAC West division championship. They finished the season 23–11, 13–5 in MAC play to win the MAC West division championship. As the No. 2 seed in the MAC tournament, they defeated Miami and Eastern Michigan before losing to Buffalo in the tournament championship. Despite winning 23 games, they did not participate in a postseason tournament.

Previous season
The Rockets finished the 2016–17 season 17–17, 9–9 in MAC play to finish in third place in the West Division. As the No. 7 seed in the MAC tournament. they defeated Bowling Green in the first round to advance to the quarterfinals where they lost to Ohio. They received an invitation to the College Basketball Invitational where they lost in the first round to George Washington.

Offseason

Recruiting class of 2017

Schedule and results

|-
!colspan=9 style=|Exhibition

|-
!colspan=9 style=|Non-conference regular season

|-
!colspan=9 style=| MAC regular season

|-
!colspan=9 style=| MAC tournament

See also
 2017–18 Toledo Rockets women's basketball team

References

Toledo
Toledo Rockets men's basketball seasons